Lüst is a surname. Notable people with the surname include:

 Dieter Lüst (born 1956), German theoretic physicist
 Reimar Lüst (1923–2020), German astrophysicist

See also
 Lusth